The World According To Goofy was a parade at Disneyland which opened in June 1992 and closed about five months later to begin a 3 month refurbishment in the It's a Small World area, which included repainting the façade to a different color and adding a gift shop. It contained floats showing the history of the world with Goofy-esqe characters portraying real ones. For example, one of the floats showed a large dinosaur that had some of Goofy's features. The parade was shown in celebration of Goofy's 60th "birthday".

Parade units

Opening Unit 
Ludwig Von Drake appears on a teacher's desk made up of history books singing the parade's theme song with the accompaniment of a school class dancing with their books.

The Pre-Hysterical Age 
Featuring dinosaurs and dancing cavepeople from the "Tar Bath Resort" and the Buddy Geyser band playing with Cave Goofy. A Brontosaurus with Goofy's face brings up the rear of the unit.

Egyptian Daze 
Goofy's vision of Ancient Egypt takes the form of a golfing tournament, featuring the Pharoah Golf Champion "King Putt", Clarabelle Cow as Cleopatra, a Goofy Sphinx, a Goofy mummy emerging from a roaming mini-pyramid, and a bizarre Goofy-faced golfball wearing a snake for a hat. The theme song for this unit was sung by Schoolhouse Rock!'s Jack Sheldon.

The Renais-Sauce 
Goofy's Renaissance is focused around the rise of wonderful food with rolling paintings featuring Marco Pollo's discovery of fried chicken and Goofrude's construction of the Leaning Tower of Pizza, with rollerskating chefs all carrying large stacks of pizza pies.

Goofy Runs for President 
The closing unit has Goofy literally marathon-running for president, with Donald, Pluto, Chip and Dale riding "Goofy's Pace Bus," a dance crew participating in the marathon at alternating speeds based on the tempo, and Goofy, Mickey, and Minnie (and added later, Max) all riding on the Finish Line float with a giant inflatable Uncle Sam Goofy. Near the end of the parade's run, following the 1992 elections (which the unit spoofed), the unit instead featured Goofy becoming Man of the Year.

See also
List of former Disneyland attractions
Mickey Mania, A parade similar to this parade that ran from 1995-1996 at Magic Kingdom

References

External links
 World According to Goofy Parade on YouTube

Former Walt Disney Parks and Resorts attractions
Walt Disney Parks and Resorts parades
1992 in California